Brittany McGowan (born 24 April 1991) is an Australian middle-distance runner. She competed in the women's 800 metres at the 2017 World Championships in Athletics.

References

External links
 
 Brittany McGowan at Athletics Australia
 Brittany McGowan at Australian Athletics Historical Results
  (2014)
 

1991 births
Living people
Australian female middle-distance runners
Commonwealth Games competitors for Australia
Athletes (track and field) at the 2018 Commonwealth Games
World Athletics Championships athletes for Australia
Place of birth missing (living people)